Myosin binding protein C, fast type is a protein that in humans is encoded by the MYBPC2 gene.

Function 

This gene encodes a member of the myosin-binding protein C family. This family includes the fast-, slow- and cardiac-type isoforms, each of which is a myosin-associated protein found in the cross-bridge-bearing zone (C region) of A bands in striated muscle. The protein encoded by this locus is referred to as the fast-type isoform. Mutations in the related but distinct genes encoding the slow-type and cardiac-type isoforms have been associated with distal arthrogryposis, type 1 and hypertrophic cardiomyopathy, respectively.

References

Further reading